Marmarole is a mountain group of the Dolomites in Belluno, northern Italy. Located west of the Cadore Valley and north-east of the major peak of Antelao, it is known as a wild range, possibly the wildest of the entire Dolomites, due to the relative difficulty of climbing its peaks and its isolation from nearby valleys. Conversely, it is a popular destination for experienced hikers and alpinists.

The highest peak of the Marmarole is the Cimon del Froppa which reaches 2,932 m.

Classification
According to SOIUSA, the Marmarole are an alpine group with the following classification:

Big part = Eastern Alps
Large sector = South-Eastern Alps
Section = Dolomites
Subsection = Sesto, Braies and Ampezzo Dolomites
Supergroup = Cadore Dolomites
Group = Marmarole Group
Code = II / C-31.I-E.21

The group is then divided into three subgroups:

Bel Pra subgroup (also called Western Marmarole)
Subgroup of Central Marmarole
Subgroup of Ciastelin (also called Oriental Marmarole)

References

Mountain ranges of Italy
Mountain ranges of the Alps
Dolomites